Padaharella Vayasu is a 1978 Indian Telugu-language romantic drama film starring Chandra Mohan, Sridevi and Mohan Babu. Directed by K. Raghavendra Rao, it is a remake of the Tamil hit 16 Vayathinile (1977), which also starred Sridevi. Like the original, the film was a success, completing 100 days in almost every theatre it was shown in.

Plot 
This film revolves around a 16-year-old girl, Malli. She is a recent high school graduate (10th pass) with exceptional scores. She is an attractive, intelligent woman living in a small society, filled with ambitions of becoming a teacher.  A new veterinarian arrives at the village hospital. Many are impressed by this charming young fellow, he seems to be wealthy and prosperous. Malli is deeply attracted to the doctor and he too in turn seems to reciprocate her feelings. Malli sacrifices her opportunity to study in the teaching college course to spend time with him. But she sees his true colors when he tries to force himself on her. Malli refuses his advances. The doctor dumps her insulting her that she is an ignorant villager and leaves the village.

Malli's mother also passes away after finding out about her daughter's affair and her failure to get any match arranged for Malli. Her only remaining family is her distant cousin Gopalakrishna, a village simpleton who is taken advantage of and isolated by the society. He is secretly in love with Malli, and is jealous and upset about the veterinarian. Another important character is the village rowdy Simhachalam, who also has an eye on Malli. With no other hope Malli gets support from Gopal and turns him into good person and gradually falls in love with him. Malli asks Gopal to make arrangements for their marriage for which Gopal goes to town in the meanwhile Simhachalam makes a rape attempt on Malli but Gopal reaches on time and kills Simhachalam he is sentenced to jail for this murder and Malli waits for him.
In the end it is shown that Gopal gets released from jail and marries Malli.

Cast 
 Chandra Mohan as Gopalakrishna
 Sridevi as Malli
 Mohan Babu as Simhachalam
 Nirmalamma as Gangamma
 Navakanth as the doctor

Production 
Sobhan Babu showed interest in character, but the character was ultimately played by Chandra Mohan. Rajinikanth expressed interesting in reprising his role from the original, but Mohan Babu was selected as he was better known in Telugu cinema. Sridevi reprised her role from the original after attempts to sign Jayasudha were unsuccessful.

The film was completed in four months. The film celebrated hundred day runs in almost all centers it was released.

Soundtrack 
The music, largely Carnatic, was composed by K. Chakravarthi. Although Chakravarthi is the music director, the main songs "Sirimallepoovaa Sirimallepoovaa" tune was originally composed by Ilaiyaraja in the Tamil version.

References

External links 
 

1970s Telugu-language films
1978 films
1978 romantic drama films
Films directed by K. Raghavendra Rao
Films scored by K. Chakravarthy
Indian romantic drama films
Telugu remakes of Tamil films